Qaleh Sangi (also Romanized as Qal‘eh Sangī; also known as Qal‘eh Sang) is a village in Kaghazkonan-e Shomali Rural District, Kaghazkonan District, Meyaneh County, East Azerbaijan Province, Iran. At the 2006 census, its population was 113, in 32 families.

References 

Populated places in Meyaneh County